Como ser Feliz ganhando Pouco is the third album from Brazilian blues/rock band O Bando do Velho Jack, and was released in 2002.

Track listing
 Como ser feliz ganhando pouco
 Eu não preciso ir ao puteiro
 Cavaleiro da pica
 Eu só sei que o seu amor nunca foi muito bom pra mim
 All Right Now
 Não fique triste
 Velhos e velhas
 Nuvens
 Longe de você
 Agora falta um
 I'm your captain (Closer to home) - Intro
 I'm Your Captain (Closer to Home)
 Nina
 Casa do rock - bonus track

References

O Bando do Velho Jack albums
2002 albums